Cuckney Hill lies between the village of Cuckney and the town of Market Warsop, in Nottinghamshire, East Midlands, England. Locals  ironically to it as 'Cuckney Mountain', as it is in fact quite small and does not stand out in the local Meden Valley region because of Welbeck Colliery's pit tip, adjacent to Cuckney Hill.

Cuckney Hill is located on the A60 road and is surrounded by trees, farmland and the pit tip. From the top of the hill you can see the whole of Market Warsop.

Hills of Nottinghamshire